Frank Cédric Tsadjout (born 28 July 1999) is an Italian professional footballer who plays as a forward for  club Cremonese.

Club career
On 18 September 2020, Tsadjout joined Serie B club Cittadella on loan. He scored his first goal in Serie B in the match against Brescia, in which they won 3–0.

On 14 July 2021, he joined Pordenone on loan.
On 5 January 2022, Tsadjout joined Ascoli on loan until 30 June 2022.

On 15 July 2022, Tsadjout signed with Cremonese.

Personal life
Born in Italy, Tsadjout is of Cameroonian descent.

Career statistics

Club

Notes

References

Living people
1999 births
Italian people of Cameroonian descent
Italian sportspeople of African descent
Sportspeople from Perugia
Italian footballers
Footballers from Umbria
Association football forwards
Belgian Pro League players
Serie B players
A.C. Milan players
R. Charleroi S.C. players
A.S. Cittadella players
Pordenone Calcio players
Ascoli Calcio 1898 F.C. players
U.S. Cremonese players
Italian expatriate footballers
Italian expatriate sportspeople in Belgium
Expatriate footballers in Belgium